Albin may refer to:

Places 
 Albin, Wyoming, US
 Albin Township, Brown County, Minnesota, US
 Albin, Virginia, US

People 
 Albin (given name), origin of the name and people with the first name "Albin"
 Albin (surname)
Mononyms
 Albin of Brechin (died 1269), Scottish bishop
 Albin (rapper), real name Albin Johnsén, Swedish rapper
 Albin (singer), mononym of Albin Sandqvist, Swedish electronic and dance pop singer

Other 
 Albin (meteorite), found in 1915 in Laramie County, Wyoming, United States
 Albin Countergambit, a chess opening
 Albin Polasek Museum and Sculpture Gardens, founded in 1961, located in Winter Park, Florida, US
 Albin Vega, a brand of yacht designed in Sweden 
 Per Albin Line, folkloric name of a 500 kilometer long line of light fortifications erected during World War II around the coast of southern Sweden 
 Brfxxccxxmnpcccclllmmnprxvclmnckssqlbb11116, the intended given name of Albin Gustaf Tarzan Hallin
 Albin, a character in La Cage aux Folles (play) and its derivative works

See also 
 Albinson (disambiguation)